The 2020 Women's Six Nations Championship was the 19th series of the Women's Six Nations Championship, an annual women's rugby union competition between six European rugby union national teams. Matches were originally scheduled for February and March 2020, on the same weekends as the men's tournament, if not always the same day.

Seven matches in the tournament were postponed due to health and safety reasons. The match between Scotland and England was originally scheduled for Sunday 9 February but was postponed to the following day with no public admission due to Storm Ciara. The game between Ireland and Wales was played as planned on 9 February. Italy's matches with Scotland, Ireland and England, scheduled for 23 February, 8 March and 15 March respectively, were all postponed due to the COVID-19 pandemic in Italy. Scotland's game against France was also postponed due to an undisclosed player testing positive of the virus and seven other players and management self-isolating. The remaining fifth round matches, scheduled for 15 March: Wales v Scotland and France v Ireland, were also postponed due to coronavirus.

A rescheduled resumption of the competition was announced on 5 August, with the Italy v Scotland match also playing part in Europe's 2021 Rugby World Cup qualifier, which was also postponed due to the coronavirus. On 10 November, it was announced that the remaining three fixtures would be cancelled.

Table

Fixtures

Week 1

Week 2

Week 3

Week 4

Week 5

Reschedule

Statistics

Top points scorers

Top try scorers

References

External links
The official Six Nations Site

2020 Six Nations Championship
2020
2020 rugby union tournaments for national teams
2019–20 in Irish rugby union
2019–20 in English rugby union
2019–20 in Welsh rugby union
2019–20 in Scottish rugby union
2019–20 in French rugby union
2019–20 in Italian rugby union
Six
rugby union
rugby union
rugby union
rugby union
rugby union
rugby union
Six Nations Championship (women)
Six Nations Championship (women)
Six Nations Championship (women)
Six Nations Championship (women)
Six Nations Championship (women)
Six Nations Championship (women)
Six Nations Championship (women)
Six Nations Championship (women)
Six Nations Championship (women), 2020